The effects of Hurricane Charley in South Carolina included $20 million (2004 USD) in damage and 135,000 power outages. Hurricane Charley lasted from August 9 to August 15, 2004, and at its peak attained  winds, making it a strong Category 4 hurricane on the Saffir-Simpson Hurricane Scale. The storm made landfall in southwestern Florida at peak strength, making it the strongest hurricane to hit the United States since Hurricane Andrew struck Florida twelve years before, in 1992.

Before the storm, Governor Mark Sanford declared a state of emergency as Charley approached its final landfall and issued a mandatory evacuation for residents on barrier islands and in coastal locations. About 180,000 people evacuated the Grand Strand. Numerous trees, tree limbs and electrical poles were knocked down in those regions. There were no fatalities.

Preparations

Prior to the storm, a tropical storm watch was issued for locations from the Altamaha sound, Georgia to the South Santee River on August 12. The next day, the watch was upgraded to a hurricane watch from the Altamaha sound to the South Carolina–Georgia border. As Charley approached the region, a hurricane warning was issued for the entire area. A tornado watch was issued eastward from a line extending from Aiken to Lancaster County.

Governor Mark Sanford declared a state of emergency as Charley approached landfall and issued a mandatory evacuation for residents on barrier islands and in coastal locations in Georgetown and Horry Counties. In Georgetown County, this order was focused on residents and tourists east of U.S. Route 17, likewise for Horry County. 180,000 people evacuated the Grand Strand. Drawbridges in Beaufort and Charleston Counties were shut down, and bridges in Georgetown and Horry Counties were locked down. Hampton County requested 2,000 sandbags, that were provided by the Department of Corrections. The Wateree Correctional Institution also filled 30,000 sandbags for potential floods. State troopers directed traffic inland from Myrtle Beach. U.S. Route 501 used a lane reversal to allow for evacuations.

Impact
With the landfalling system, five tornadoes were reported in the state. However, only two were confirmed; one moved through the Francis Marion National Forest, downing trees along its path.

Trees, limbs and electrical poles were knocked down in those regions. Trees were blown onto U.S. Route 17 in Mount Pleasant, and awnings were torn off of a few structures. A total of 2,231 houses were damaged; 2317 of these were severely damaged and 40 were destroyed. Two-hundred and twenty-one of those damaged were beach front structures on Sunset Beach. Businesses had broken windows, six hotels had roof and outer wall damage. This led to $30 million (2004 USD) in hotel profit loss in Myrtle Beach, primarily along U.S. Route 17.

As dry air from northern sections of the state wrapped into the circulation of the storm, a band of convection developed along a frontal boundary stretching from Newberry northward. Widespread rainfall peaking at over  fell to the west of the storm's track. In downtown Charleston,  of rainfall was reported, while in Hampton  of rain fell. However, the bulk of the rainfall remained offshore. With the soil still saturated from Tropical Storm Bonnie, some flooding in low-lying areas of Charleston County occurred. Flash floods were also observed in Mount Pleasant. High winds spread vegetative debris, clogging storm drains and caused further flooding. A bridge in Union County washed out following rainfall from Charley and Tropical Storm Bonnie. 135,000 customers were without power, and storm damage totaled $20 million (2004 USD).

Following the storm, Progress Energy Carolinas assembled 1,200 tree and power line personnel to assist in damage recovery. Federal disaster funds were approved for the counties of Georgetown and Horry. The declaration covered damage to public property on August 14–15. The funding covered state and local government costs for debris removal and emergency services related to the hurricane.

See also

Effects of Hurricane Charley in North Carolina
List of retired Atlantic hurricanes

References

External links
Hurricane Charley Tropical Cyclone Report

South Carolina
Charley Effect
2004 in South Carolina
Charley
Charley South Carolina